The 1934 Colorado gubernatorial election was held on November 6, 1934. Incumbent Democrat Edwin C. Johnson defeated Republican nominee Nathan C. Warren with 58.11% of the vote.

Primary elections
Primary elections were held on September 11, 1934.

Democratic primary

Candidates
Edwin C. Johnson, incumbent Governor
Josephine Roche, former Chair of the Colorado Progressive Party

Results

Republican primary

Candidates
Nathan C. Warren, State Senator

Results

General election

Candidates
Major party candidates
Edwin C. Johnson, Democratic
Nathan C. Warren, Republican

Other candidates
Paul S. McCormick, Socialist
Paul W. Hipp, Prohibition
P. C. Feste, Communist

Results

References

1934
Colorado
Gubernatorial